General Carson may refer to:

Charles Frederick Carson (1886–1960), British Army brigadier general
James Harvey Carson (1808–1884), Virginia Militia brigadier general in the American Civil War
John Miller Carson Jr. (1864–1956), U.S. Army brigadier general
Kit Carson (1809–1868), U.S. Army brevet brigadier general

See also
Attorney General Carson (disambiguation)